Last of the Line is the sixth studio album by English folk metal band Forefather. It was officially released on 19 December 2011 by their own record label, Seven Kingdoms.

Track listing
 "Cometh the King" – 0:54
 "Last of the Line" – 4:44
 "Chorus of Steel" – 4:43
 "By Thy Deeds" – 4:51
 "Up High" – 5:09
 "Wolves of Prayer" – 4:58
 "Wyrda Gesceaft" – 3:06
 "Doomsday Dawns" – 6:43
 "Shadows of the Dead" – 5:25
 "Spears of Faith" – 4:54
 "The Downfallen" – 5:53
 "Into the Rising Sun" – 3:52

References

2011 albums
Forefather albums